Call of Duty: Modern Warfare 2 is a 2009 first-person shooter game developed by Infinity Ward and published by Activision. It is the sixth installment in the Call of Duty series and the direct sequel to Call of Duty 4: Modern Warfare. It was released worldwide on November 10, 2009, for Microsoft Windows, the PlayStation 3, and Xbox 360. A separate version for the Nintendo DS, titled Modern Warfare: Mobilized, was also released on the same day. A version for macOS was developed by Aspyr and released in May 2014, and the Xbox 360 version was made backward compatible for the Xbox One in 2018.

The game's campaign follows Task Force 141, a multi-national special forces unit commanded by Captain Soap MacTavish as they hunt Vladimir Makarov, leader of the Russian Ultranationalist party, and U.S. Army Rangers from 1st Battalion/75th Ranger Regiment who are defending the Washington, D.C. area from a Russian invasion. The game's main playable characters are Sergeant Gary "Roach" Sanderson, of the 141, and Private James Ramirez, of the Army Rangers, with Captain MacTavish becoming playable later in the campaign. An expansive multiplayer mode is featured in the game, with several new features and modes that were not seen in its predecessor.

Development for the game began in 2008, when it was still known as Call of Duty 6. It uses the IW 4.0 engine, an improved version of Call of Duty 4s IW 3.0. Infinity Ward was inspired by real-life conflicts when developing the campaign mode. They initially tested the multiplayer mode by playing an in-house beta version of the game. Modern Warfare 2 was officially announced in February 2009. Teasing of the game began in March, with short trailers being released for the game and, eventually, a full reveal trailer. The multiplayer mode was revealed shortly after. Two downloadable content packs were released for it post-release, each containing five new multiplayer maps, with some being remastered maps from Call of Duty 4.

Modern Warfare 2 received universal acclaim, with praise for its campaign, multiplayer, and amount of content, although it received some criticism for its short length and a lack of innovation. Within 24 hours of release, the game sold approximately 4.7 million copies in North America and the United Kingdom. As of 2013, the game had sold 22.7 million copies. In addition to its release, a comic book series based on character Simon "Ghost" Riley was also produced, titled Modern Warfare 2: Ghost. Despite the game's success, it was subject to some controversies, with one surrounding a playable level that had the player carry out a terror attack on an airport. A sequel, Call of Duty: Modern Warfare 3, was released in 2011 and finishes the original Modern Warfare storyline. A remaster of the game's campaign, Call of Duty: Modern Warfare 2 Campaign Remastered, was released in March 2020 on the PlayStation 4 and on Microsoft Windows and Xbox One in April 2020.

Gameplay
Call of Duty: Modern Warfare 2 is a first person shooter, and its gameplay revolves around fast-paced gunfights against enemy combatants. The player controls a soldier who can perform several actions, including jump, sprint, crouch, lay prone, and aim down their gun's iron sights. When the player is shot by an enemy, blood will splatter their heads-up display (HUD), denoting that they have taken damage; if the player avoids gunfire by taking cover, their health will recover. The HUD also displays other information, such as a compass, a mini-map, and the player's current ammunition count. The game features traditional guns, including assault rifles, shotguns, handguns, and sniper rifles. The player will be given specific guns at the beginning of each level, but may switch them out with another gun they find. Some guns have attachments, such as suppressors, and heartbeat sensors. The player can use grenades and flashbangs when faced with a large group of enemies, as well as a knife for close quarters combat. In some levels, the player will be given special equipment, such as night vision goggles, or a laser designator.

Call of Duty: Modern Warfare 2 has three different game modes: Campaign, Spec Ops, and Multiplayer. Campaign is a single-player mode where the player completes eighteen levels connected by an overarching plot. Each level features a series of objectives to fulfill, and the player will often switch characters between levels. If the player dies during a level, they will respawn at the most recent checkpoint. Levels can be played on one of four difficulties, and each level can be replayed after it has been completed. Spec Ops mode features twenty-three additional levels that can be played individually or cooperatively with a partner. These levels provide specific challenges, such as defusing three bombs within a short period of time. If one player is shot down while playing cooperatively, they will begin crawling, and can shoot enemies with a handgun. If they are not revived by the other player, then they will die and fail the level. There are five tiers of Spec Ops levels, with each tier harder than the previous. Only the first tier is available from the beginning, as later tiers can be unlocked with enough stars. The player earns stars by completing the levels on one of three difficulties, with the number of stars earned corresponding to the difficulty chosen.

Multiplayer mode allows players to compete against each other in team-based and deathmatch-based game types on various maps. Each game type has an objective that requires unique strategies to complete. If the player kills three or more players in a row without dying, they achieve a "killstreak", which gives the player a tactical advantage during a match. These include a Predator missile, a sentry gun, and a "tactical nuke". Alternatively, if the player dies several times without a kill, they will be rewarded with a "deathstreak" bonus, which evens the match for the player. A match ends when either a team or player has reached a predefined number of points, or the allotted time expires in which case the team or player with the most points wins. The player's performance in multiplayer is tracked with experience points, which can be earned by killing opposing players, completing objectives, or by completing a match. As the player gains experience, they advance in level, unlocking new weapons. The player will also unlock perks, which modify gameplay elements such as unlimited sprint and increased bullet damage.

Plot

Characters and setting
During the single-player campaign, the player controls five different characters from a first-person perspective. The player primarily controls Sergeant Gary "Roach" Sanderson, a British member of an international special forces unit named Task Force 141. In addition to Roach, the player will also assume control of Private First Class Joseph Allen (Troy Baker) and Private James Ramirez of the U.S. Army's 1st Battalion/75th Ranger Regiment. The now Captain John "Soap" MacTavish (Kevin McKidd) serves as a senior member of Task Force 141, acting as Roach's superior officer and becomes the playable character in the final three missions of the game. Lastly, the player briefly assumes the role of an astronaut stationed on the International Space Station during the height of the war between the United States and Russia.

The game's non-playable characters (NPCs) feature prominently in the story: For Task Force 141, Lieutenant Simon "Ghost" Riley (Craig Fairbrass), who conceals his face with a skull print balaclava serves as Soap's second in command. For the United States Army Rangers, Sergeant Foley (Keith David), along with his subordinate, Corporal Dunn (Barry Pepper), is initially Joseph Allen's squad leader, and becomes James Ramirez's squad leader later in the story. Lieutenant General Shepherd (Lance Henriksen) is the commander of the United States Army Rangers and Task Force 141. Other supporting characters returning from Call of Duty 4 include Captain John Price (Billy Murray), MacTavish's former commanding officer in the British Special Air Service who was imprisoned in Russia, and Russian informant turned mercenary pilot "Nikolai" (Sven Holmberg).

Story
Despite the events of the previous game preventing a nuclear war, the Ultranationalists ultimately seize control of Russia and Imran Zakhaev becomes a martyr. Diplomatic relations with the United States plummet as a result, while Vladimir Makarov, an Ultranationalist extremist and Zakhaev's protege, commits to a five-year campaign of vengeance against the West with acts of terrorism. In 2016, Private First Class Joseph Allen, whose actions in Afghanistan impress U.S. Army General Shepherd, is embedded into Makarov's team, who commit a mass shooting at an airport in Moscow, killing multiple Russian civilians. Makarov, aware of Allen's true identity, kills the American, leaving his body at the airport to implicate the United States in a false flag operation.

Meanwhile, Sergeant Gary "Roach" Sanderson is sent with Captain John "Soap" MacTavish to secure an Attack Characterization System (ACS) module from a downed American satellite that has been retrieved by Russian forces and kept in a hangar at an airbase in the Tian Shan range of Kazakhstan. After learning of the airport massacre, Soap, Roach, and several other members of the multinational special forces outfit "Task Force 141" are sent to Rio de Janeiro and succeed in capturing Alejandro Rojas, Makarov's arms dealer. In retaliation for the airport massacre, Russia launches a surprise invasion of the United States's Eastern Coast, achieved by their earlier capture of the ACS module and disabling American satellites over North America, leaving NORAD blind to their attack.

Learning that Makarov's nemesis is imprisoned in the Russian Far East, Task Force 141 partakes in a counterattack there and rescues the prisoner: Captain John Price. Price rejoins Task Force 141, and in an effort to give the U.S. forces a much-needed advantage, boards a Russian nuclear submarine on their next mission and launches a ballistic missile which detonates above Washington in the upper atmosphere. During the counter-attack, the Americans save the White House from a United States Air Force bomb run to deny the city to the Russians, retaining control.

Task Force 141 are sent to two separate locations in search of Makarov; Roach is sent with Simon "Ghost" Riley and other members to a safehouse on the Georgian border, but are betrayed and killed by General Shepherd to tie up loose ends for his involvement in prolonging the Russian-American war. Meanwhile, Price and Soap are ambushed by Shepherd's own private forces battling Makarov's at an aircraft boneyard in Afghanistan but manage to escape. Makarov reveals Shepherd's location to the 141 over radio communications; Price and Soap launch a suicide mission to take revenge on Shepherd. After a lengthy pursuit, Soap attempts to kill Shepherd but is stabbed in the chest. Before Shepherd can execute Soap, Price intervenes and engages in a fistfight with Shepherd, giving Soap enough time to pull the knife from his chest and throw it at Shepherd, killing him. Nikolai arrives by helicopter and evacuates Price and Soap, leading them to a safe place.

Development
Modern Warfare 2 was originally announced as Call of Duty 6. The game was first announced under the title Call of Duty: Modern Warfare 2 by Activision on December 3, 2008. Activision subsequently retracted its announcement, stating that any information about an upcoming Call of Duty game was "speculative." Infinity Ward then asserted that it had not officially confirmed its latest project at that time. On February 11, 2009, Activision officially announced Modern Warfare 2 and set a tentative release date for "Holiday 2009." The game was tested in an internal beta by the development team. While both Call of Duty 4 and Call of Duty: World at War had been preceded by public multiplayer betas, no such beta was released for Modern Warfare 2 because it was determined that, according to Community Manager Robert Bowling, no public beta was needed unless the internal beta did not provide adequate feedback.  While Treyarch was able to port Modern Warfare to the Wii and release it on the same day Modern Warfare 2 was released, Infinity Ward declined to make a Wii version of the sequel.  According to Bowling, Infinity Ward determined that the Wii's technical limitations made it impossible to deliver the same cinematic experience that the sequel aspired to present.

Infinity Ward announced in October 2009 that the PC version of Modern Warfare 2 would not support the use of user-run dedicated servers or in-game console commands. This announcement was received poorly by some members of the PC community, eventually instigating a response from Infinity Ward in an attempt to put the community at ease. During brainstorming sessions, an idea came forth on what if the ending of Modern Warfare was a loss, leading to the sequel. In an interview with Jesse Stern, he talked to producers of Infinity Ward with ideas such as "outbreaks, viruses, chemical warfare, and even outlandish things such as aliens and the living dead." Stern mentioned having the game based on real-life conflicts before they halted further planning at first due to events in the 2008 South Ossetia war and in the Mumbai terrorist attacks.

Game engine
The game utilizes the in-house IW 4.0 game engine, which is claimed to be a generation beyond the capabilities of the engine used in Call of Duty 4. Although proprietary, the game is based on an unspecified id Tech engine, and can accommodate larger worlds, enhanced graphic detail, and more efficient rendering. Infinity Ward has addressed the issue of enemies that continually respawn at different points of a level. The developer demonstrated that the game engine uses a "dynamic AI", which has replaced the infinite respawn system and allows enemies to act more independently. These "smarter" enemies are designed to actively seek out and drive the player forward through a level, and can break away from set behaviors such as following a designated route in order to attack. The player cannot depend on enemies to be found in the same locations as a previous play-through because enemies will behave differently each time a level is played.

Audio
On August 20, 2009, Robert Bowling revealed through Twitter that Kevin McKidd, Craig Fairbrass, Barry Pepper, Keith David, and Glenn Morshower were confirmed voice actors for the game. It was later confirmed that McKidd would voice the protagonist, "Soap" MacTavish. Fairbrass, who voiced Gaz in Call of Duty 4, provided voice work for "Ghost". Billy Murray reprised his role as Captain Price from Call of Duty 4. Rapper 50 Cent provided voice work for the Special Ops and multiplayer modes, portraying "one of the squad [member] voices." The main theme of Call of Duty: Modern Warfare 2 was provided by Hollywood composer Hans Zimmer, while the rest of the score was composed by Lorne Balfe. The soundtrack was released on June 1, 2010. The iTunes page for the soundtrack incorrectly lists Zimmer as the soundtrack's only composer.

Marketing and release
On March 25, 2009, a teaser trailer for the game was revealed at the Game Developer Choice Awards ceremony in San Francisco. The teaser was posted on Infinity Ward's website, and released on the Xbox Live Marketplace and the PlayStation Network a short time later. A second teaser was released on May 10, 2009, and showed gameplay features such as snowmobile driving and underwater actions. The teaser announced that the game would be "revealed" on TNT during the NBA Eastern Conference Finals on May 24, 2009. The "reveal" was the first full-length trailer, which debuted extended sequences of actual in-game scenes and combat; the trailer was subsequently made available on the Modern Warfare 2 official website, which was kept updated for the occasion. A fourth trailer was released on July 27, 2009, and showed the first footage of the game's multiplayer mode. On October 4, 2009, a second full-length cinematic trailer was released and revealed that part of the game would take place in a war-torn Washington, D.C.

On July 21, 2009, Infinity Ward's Robert Bowling revealed through Twitter that a Modern Warfare 2 controller was in the works. Peripherals manufacturer Mad Catz was contracted by Activision to create a line of Modern Warfare 2 controllers and accessories for all platforms that the game would be available on. Activision stated, in its quarterly earnings report, that pre-orders for the game had broken a company record; more copies of Modern Warfare 2 had been pre-ordered than any other game that the company had published before. In September 2009, Monster Energy teamed up with Activision to bring special redeemable codes on the Monster Energy website, where people may submit codes included in Monster Energy packs to redeem items such as Xbox 360 Premium Themes and a Modern Warfare 2 Map Pack code.

Title
The original teaser trailer confirmed that the game's title of Call of Duty: Modern Warfare 2 was officially shortened to just Modern Warfare 2. After photographs of the official retail boxes were posted by Robert Bowling, Activision confirmed that the standard-edition Modern Warfare 2 packaging would feature the Call of Duty brand logo in order to reflect the game's association with the Call of Duty franchise. It is speculated that the decision was influenced by findings that brand awareness for the game was significantly lower without the Call of Duty logo. However, the developers still prefer to simply call the game Modern Warfare 2 as they consider it a new IP. The menus in the game also refer to the title as simply Modern Warfare 2.

Retail versions
Modern Warfare 2 was released in four different retail versions across the PlayStation 3 and Xbox 360 platforms: Standard, Hardened, Veteran, and Prestige. The standard version consists of the game and an instructional manual, and is the only version available for the Microsoft Windows platform. The Hardened Edition consists of the game and manual (which are packaged in a steel book case), an art book, and a token that allows one to download Call of Duty Classic, a hi-definition version of the original Call of Duty game, from Xbox Live Arcade or the PlayStation Store (Classic was released individually on December 2, 2009). The Prestige Edition contains all of the elements of the Hardened Edition, but also includes a set of fully functioning night vision goggles, imprinted with the Modern Warfare 2 logo, and a stand modeled after the head of the character "Soap" MacTavish. The goggles are powered by five AA batteries and can see up to 50 feet in absolute darkness.

On September 15, 2009, Activision and Microsoft jointly announced a special, limited Modern Warfare 2 version of the Xbox 360 with a 250 GB hard disk. The unit is highlighted by special game product branding and includes two black wireless controllers, a black wired headset, an ethernet cable, a standard definition composite A/V cable, and the standard edition version of the game. This is the first Xbox 360 to come with a 250 GB hard drive. On September 18, UK and rep of Ireland retailer GAME announced a Veteran Edition of Modern Warfare 2 would be exclusive to rep of Ireland and UK. It will come with a 12" (30.5 cm) tall statue of "Soap" MacTavish with interchangeable arms and weapons; has the same contents as the Hardened Edition. In September 2009, a Veteran Statue Bundle of Modern Warfare 2 was posted on the EB Games website and is available for all platforms.

Modern Warfare 2 was ported to the Nintendo DS with the title Call of Duty: Modern Warfare: Mobilized and a different storyline, released on November 10, 2009. It was also ported to macOS by Aspyr years after the game's original release. This version was released on May 20, 2014, alongside the macOS port for Call of Duty: Modern Warfare 3. The Xbox 360 version of Modern Warfare 2 was made backward compatible with the Xbox One on August 28, 2018.

Downloadable content
Activision announced that two downloadable map packs would be released for Modern Warfare 2. At E3 2009, Microsoft stated that these map packs would first be made available for the Xbox 360 via Xbox Live before they would be released for other platforms. Robert Bowling stated that the community response to the game and the first ten downloadable map packs would be used in designing other potential map packs.

The first map pack, titled the "Stimulus Package," was released first for Xbox Live on March 30, 2010 and for PlayStation Network and PC on May 4, 2010, in North America. The pack contains five maps: reincarnations of the Crash and Overgrown maps from Call of Duty 4, and three new maps: Bailout, a multi-level apartment complex; Storm, an industrial park littered with heavy machinery; and Salvage, an abandoned car junkyard in the middle of the snow. Within 24 hours of its release, it was downloaded over one million times. Within the first week it had been downloaded 2.5 million times, breaking Xbox Live DLC records. In addition to integrating the maps into all existing game types, the Stimulus Package adds two new game modes, randomizing the built-in game types in either normal or hardcore mode.

Activision released the second downloadable map pack, titled the "Resurgence Package", exclusively for Xbox Live on June 3, 2010, in North America. This release was followed by the PlayStation Network and PC versions on July 6 in North America and on July 7 worldwide. The package includes five new multiplayer maps: reincarnations of the Strike and Vacant maps from Call of Duty 4, and three new maps: Carnival, a desolated amusement park; Trailer Park, a mobile home park; and Fuel, an oil refinery. Both of the map packs were made available for purchase on macOS on May 20, 2014, when the macOS port of the game was released.

Comic

A six-part comic book mini-series related to the game has also been produced. Announced by Robert Bowling on August 17, 2009, Modern Warfare 2: Ghost is focused on the backstory of the character Ghost, who appears in the video game as a member of Task Force 141. The series is published by WildStorm. The first issue of the series debuted on November 11, 2009.

Short film

A fan-made prequel to Modern Warfare 2, entitled Find Makarov: Operation Kingfish, premiered at Call of Duty: XP 2011. The video was produced by We Can Pretend, visual effects by The Junction, and was endorsed by Activision. The first film, Find Makarov, was a non-canon fan made film. Activision contacted We Can Pretend about the video and helped produce a second canon short film, Find Makarov: Operation Kingfish. The prequel tells the story of how Task Force 141 first tried to capture Vladimir Makarov, who was known then as Kingfish. It also tells how Soap got his facial scars, and how Price was captured and incarcerated in a gulag.

Reception

Call of Duty: Modern Warfare 2 received "universal acclaim" for the PlayStation 3 and Xbox 360 versions, and "generally positive" reviews for the PC version, according to review aggregator Metacritic. Reviewers praised the in-depth story mode, mini missions, and multiplayer.

1UP.com stated "Mixing real-world locations with bombastic set-pieces MW2 continues the guided, thrill-ride experiences of its predecessor, and adds even more depth to its multiplayer offerings. It might not have fixed all the problems from the first game, but there's just so much quality content packed into this game that it will almost certainly be one of the most-played games in your library for a long time to come". Game Informer noted praised the game for its polish and iteration on the series, as well as its strong presentation and wealth of playable content. IGN called it a "no-brainer purchase", thanks to its online multiplayer, its co-op mode, and its campaign. GameTrailers stated "The air of unpredictability and the care that was paid to each separate element puts it in lofty company. The multiplayer hasn't received an overhaul, but considering most shooters are still playing catch-up with Call of Duty 4, the tweaks and twists make it the best multiplayer shooting experience in the industry. Few games manage to meet such high expectations". Computer and Video Games called the game "Loud, epic and incredibly polished, [and] this year's biggest must-have shooter".

Criticism of the game focused on the short length of the single player campaign. IGN's Mark Bozon remarks that the single-player of "Modern Warfare 2 is surprisingly short, and doesn't live up to the standard set by previous Call of Duty games." In addition, many reviewers have complained about the lack of innovation to the formula of the series.

Famitsu named Modern Warfare 2 as the number one game on the top 10 video games sold in 2009, beating games such as Metal Gear Solid 4, Uncharted 2: Among Thieves, Halo 3 and Grand Theft Auto IV. It also gave the game a score of 39/40, being one of the few Western games released in Japan to have the same score as Grand Theft Auto IV. In 2011, readers of Guinness World Records Gamer's Edition voted Simon "Ghost" Riley as the 40th-top video game character of all time.

Sales and revenue
According to preliminary sales figures from Activision, Modern Warfare 2 sold approximately 4.7 million units in the United States and the UK combined in the first 24 hours of its release. The total revenue from first day sales in the U.S. and the UK was $310 million, making Modern Warfare 2 the biggest entertainment launch in history at the time, surpassing in revenue its predecessor, Call of Duty 4: Modern Warfare, as well as items from other media types. After five days of sales, the game had earned revenue figures of $550 million worldwide. , it has taken over $1 billion in sales. Activision also claims that Modern Warfare 2 had 8 million players online within the first five days, constituting the largest 'army' of players in the world. On March 8, 2010, Robert Bowling announced that the game had amassed 25 million unique players. In June 2010, Activision's CFO Thomas Tippl revealed that the game had sold 20 million copies. In August 2011, Activision Publishing CEO Eric Hirshberg revealed that the game had sold 22 million copies. A month later in September 2011, Modern Warfare 3 producer Mark Rubin, said that the game's number (not confirmed as players or sales) was between 28 and 29 million. In November 2013, IGN put the game's sales at 22.7 million.

According to the NPD Group, Modern Warfare 2 sold approximately 4.2 million units for the Xbox 360 and 1.87 million units for the PlayStation 3 in the U.S. during the month of November 2009. In Japan, Modern Warfare 2 sold 64,000 copies for the PlayStation 3 and 42,000 copies for the Xbox 360 in its first week of sales. The game later sold 117,000 copies on the PlayStation 3 and 61,000 on the Xbox 360. Anita Frazier of the NPD Group reported in March 2010 that the game had sold slightly under 10 million copies in the U.S. alone. The game had also became the second best-selling game of all time in both the UK and the U.S.

After it became backward compatible with the Xbox One, the NPD Group reported that Modern Warfare 2 was the eighth-best selling video game in the United States during August 2018. It had sold more copies in that month than the then-most recent entry in the series, Call of Duty: WWII, which came out in November 2017. During the previous month, before becoming backward compatible, Modern Warfare 2 was at only number 321 on the best sellers list.

Awards
Modern Warfare 2 received awards from various gaming sites and publications, it gained high praise from some video game magazines. At the 2009 Spike Video Game Awards, Modern Warfare 2 received the Best Shooter and Best Multiplayer awards. Both GameSpy and GameTrailers gave the game the Best Overall Game of 2009 award and received from GameTrailers six awards overall. GameSpot and Metacritic, both gave it the Best Xbox 360 Game award, and from GameTrailers received the game the Best Multiplayer award including the Best First-Person Shooter award. At the 6th British Academy Games Awards, it won the GAME Award which was selected via a public vote.

Controversies

Various portions of the campaign have caused some controversy, including the depiction of a massacre carried out in a Russian airport, in the mission "No Russian", the fourth mission in the game. This mission can be skipped entirely before the player begins the single-player campaign.

Anders Behring Breivik claimed in his manifesto that he used the game for training to prepare for the 2011 Norway attacks. Coop Norge, a chain of retail stores in Norway, removed the game from its shelves as a result of this attack.

A YouTube user claimed that two paintings in the multiplayer map Favela offended Muslims. Activision removed the controversial paintings and apologized for its offense to Muslims. The amended Favela map was added back into the Xbox 360 and PS3 versions of the game, however was permanently taken out of the PC version.

Technical problems
After the successful hack on the PlayStation 3 in January 2011, some Modern Warfare 2 players on the PlayStation 3 have had their stats hacked or completely deleted. Infinity Ward replied that their advice was to play in private games, waiting for Sony to fix the problems on the platform side, saying that they could not patch the security problem themselves.

Remastered version
Call of Duty: Modern Warfare 2 Campaign Remastered, a visually-updated version of the original, was released for PlayStation 4 on March 31, 2020, and for Xbox One and Microsoft Windows on April 30, 2020. It only includes the campaign mode with no multiplayer and Spec Ops components; when purchased players unlock various cosmetic items in 2019's Call of Duty: Modern Warfare and 2020's Call of Duty: Warzone.

On Metacritic, the PlayStation 4 version of the remaster holds a weighted average score of 71 out of 100, based on 37 critics, indicating "mixed or average reviews".

Notes and references
Notes

References

Bibliography

External links
 
 

Modern Warfare 2
2009 video games
Activision games
Alternate history video games
Cooperative video games
First-person shooter multiplayer online games
First-person shooters
Science fiction shooter video games
Insurgency in Khyber Pakhtunkhwa fiction
Interactive Achievement Award winners
Fiction about invasions
MacOS games
Martyrdom in fiction
Mass murder in fiction
Multiplayer and single-player video games
Multiplayer online games
Obscenity controversies in video games
PlayStation 3 games
Square Enix games
Video game sequels
Video games about revenge
Video games about the Special Air Service
Video games about the United States Navy SEALs
Video games scored by Hans Zimmer
Video games scored by Lorne Balfe
Video games scored by Mark Mancina
Video games set in 2016
Video games set in Afghanistan
Video games set in Brazil
Video games set in Karachi
Video games set in Kazakhstan
Video games set in Los Angeles
Video games set in Moscow
Video games set in New York City
Video games set in Pakistan
Video games set in Russia
Video games set in Virginia
Video games set in Washington, D.C.
War video games set in the United States
Weapons of mass destruction in fiction
Windows games
World War III video games
Xbox 360 games
BAFTA winners (video games)
Spike Video Game Award winners
Infinity Ward games
D.I.C.E. Award for Action Game of the Year winners
D.I.C.E. Award for Online Game of the Year winners
Aspyr games
Video games developed in the United States